Chiang Yuen is a district (amphoe) in the northern part of Maha Sarakham province, northeastern Thailand.

Geography
Neighboring districts are (from the north clockwise): Chuen Chom of Maha Sarakham Province; Yang Talat of Kalasin province; Kantharawichai and Kosum Phisai of Maha Sarakham; Mueang Khon Kaen and Sam Sung of Khon Kaen province.

History
On 16 August 1958 the minor district (king amphoe) was split off from Kantharawichai district, consisting of the four tambons Chiang Yuen, Chuen Chom, Ku Thong, and Nong Son. On 11 December 1959 it was upgraded to a full district.

Administration
The district is divided into eight sub-districts (tambons), which are further subdivided into 116 villages (mubans). Chiang Yuen is a sub-district municipality (thesaban tambon) which covers parts of tambon Chiang Yuen. There are a further eight tambon administrative organizations (TAO).

Missing numbers are the tambons which now form Chuen Chom District.

References

External links
amphoe.com (Thai)

Chiang Yuen